Tow Law  is a town and civil parish in County Durham, England. It is situated a few miles to the south of Consett and 5 miles to the north west of Crook.

According to the 2001 census it had a population of 1,952, increasing to 2,138 at the 2011 Census.

The main road through the town is the A68, which starts in Darlington and goes on north, ending near Dalkeith, just south-east of Edinburgh. The River Deerness rises from a spring on the eastern edge of the town.

Tow Law Town football club is based in the town. The town is mentioned in Mark Knopfler's song "Hill Farmer's Blues" from his album The Ragpicker's Dream.

History
The name "Tow Law" is from the Old English tot hlaw meaning "lookout mound," the name of a house which stood there before the iron works and the village were built.

There was rapid growth in the mid 19th century after the Weardale Iron and Coal Company was established here in 1845. Blast furnaces were built and collieries were opened; the population was about 2000 in 1851, and 5000 in 1881.

The town constituted an urban district from 1894 until 1974.

21st century
Since December 2001 the town has had a 2.3 Megawatt wind farm consisting of three -high wind-powered turbines. During the 2001 foot and mouth crisis, MAFF buried diseased animals at the former Inkerman Pit site. This was an emotive issue for local residents, who were disturbed by vehicle movements and smells from the pit. Many protesters attended the site every day for six months but had no effect and Defra continued to keep the site operational until the spring of 2002.

Notable people

 Albert Ernest Hillary, English chocolate manufacturer and Liberal politician 
 Sean Hodgson, Britain’s longest serving prisoner (27 years) found to be innocent
 Alan Milburn, a British Labour politician
 Chris Waddle, former Premier League footballer played for Tow Law Town A.F.C.

References

External links
 Tow law Community Association
 Tow Law History Society

 
Towns in County Durham
Civil parishes in County Durham
Wind farms in England